Archana Aaradhana is a 1985 Indian Malayalam-language film, directed Sajan. The film stars Shankar, Menaka, Ambika and Sukumari. The film has musical score by Shyam. It is a remake of the 1985 Hindi film Bahu Ki Awaaz.

Cast

 Shankar as Vimal Kumar
 Menaka as Aradhana
 Ambika as Archana
 Sukumari as Soumini
 Innocent as Kurupu
 Beena Sabu as Mallika
 Jose Prakash as Adv Gopinatha menon
 Sankaradi as Shivashankaran Nair
 Bharath Gopi as Adv Rajendran
 James
 Jagannatha Varma as Judge
 Paravoor Bharathan as Vimal's father 
 Shivaji as Ramakrishnan
 Baby Soumya as Ammini

Soundtrack
The music was composed by Shyam and the lyrics were written by Poovachal Khader.

References

External links
 
 

1985 films
1980s Malayalam-language films
Films directed by Sajan